Engla Tocyme (The Coming of the English) is the third studio album by the English pagan metal band Forefather. It was recorded from September to November 2001 and released in 2002 by Angelisc Enterprises. In 2004 Karmageddon Media re-released the album with two bonus tracks.

Track listing

Personnel
Athelstan - guitars, bass, keyboards, drums
Wulfstan - vocals, guitars, bass
Christian Andersson - cover art

2002 albums
Forefather albums
Karmageddon Media albums